Montlaur is a commune in the Haute-Garonne department of southwestern France. Montlaur station has rail connections to Toulouse, Carcassonne and Narbonne.

Population

See also
Communes of the Haute-Garonne department

References

Communes of Haute-Garonne